Heel strike may refer to:
 Heel strike (gait) – the foot contacting the ground heel-first during the foot strike phase of walking or running.
 A strike (attack) using the heel, such as a stomp.